The Joint Anti-Terrorist Task Force (JATF) is a security agency of the Government of Uganda. The Museveni administration created the JATF through the Anti-Terrorism Act of 2002.

The Task Force's main focus is fighting the Lord's Resistance Army, a militant cult operating in northern Uganda which the United States government designated a terrorist organization in 2001. Along with the Internal Security Organization (ISO) and the Chieftaincy of Military Intelligence (CMI), from which the JATF draws many of its members, the JATF has drawn international criticism with claims of torture and illegal detention of suspects – charges which the government has denied.

See also
Human rights in Uganda
Uganda People's Defence Force

External links
Security Force Executions Reported (Human Rights Watch, October 3, 2003)

Government agencies of Uganda
Law enforcement in Uganda
Terrorism in Uganda
Counterterrorism